The Saudi Arabia lobby in the United States is a collection of lawyers, public relation firms and professional lobbyists paid directly by the government of Saudi Arabia to lobby the public and government of the United States on behalf of the interests of the government of Saudi Arabia.

Power of the lobby
An article by journalist John R. MacArthur in Harper's Magazine  details "The Vast Power of the Saudi Lobby".  According to MacArthur, 

According to Seymour Hersh the power of Prince Bandar and the Saudi lobby was so great that Bandar effectively joined the Bush administration as a virtual member of the cabinet.

George Washington University Professor Hossein Askari blames the "power of the Saudi lobby in Washington" for the failure of the American government to defend the democracy protesters in Bahrain in 2011.  According to Askari, "our marriage to the Al-Sauds threatens our (American) national security."

Role of Bandar bin Sultan
In the assessment of The Economist, "No Arab ambassador—perhaps no ambassador—has come close to matching Prince Bandar's influence in the American capital. At the height of his powers he was indispensable to both sides: in Mr Ottaway's words, "at once the king's exclusive messenger and the White House's errand boy".
The Prince's "feats" of lobbying legerdemain included  securing the purchase of AWACS surveillance aircraft in the teeth of fierce Israeli and congressional opposition, and augmenting his influence with the Reagan administration by quietly supplying $32m to the Contras in Nicaragua and $10m to anti-communist politicians in Italy.

Atlantic Council and The Centre for Strategic and International Studies

The Atlantic Council received $2 million in 2015 from the United Arab Emirates and benefactors close to Saudi Arabia. 

The Centre for Strategic and International Studies (CSIS) received $600,000 in 2015 from Riyadh and Abu Dhabi.

Following the money
In the first decade of the 21st century, the Saudis paid approximately $100 million to American firms to lobby the American government.

Major lobbying firms that work as lobbyists in the pay of the Saudi government include Hill & Knowlton, which  has been employed to lobby for Saudi Arabia since 1982. Qorvis Communications has worked for Saudi Arabia since the 9/11 attacks, receiving over  $60.3 million over the course of a decade. Hogan Lovells U.S., L.L.P., formerly Hogan & Harston, worked for  Saudi Arabia in 2009.  The  Loeffler Group, LLP, headed by former Congressman Tom Loeffler of Texas, was paid $10.5 million by the Saudi government during the first decade of the century, and gave Sandler Innocenzi, Inc. $8.9 million.  Patton Boggs, LLP, earned over $3 million from Saudi Arabia for lobbying in the first decade of the century.

The Middle East Policy Council has received large payments from Saudi Arabia to lobby for the Kingdom, including $1 million in 2007.

A partial list of firms that have been paid by Saudi Arabia to lobby the American government includes:
 Akin Gump Strauss Hauer & Feld LLP: $220,770
 Boland & Madigan, Inc: $420,000
 Burson-Marsteller: $3,619,286.85
 Cambridge Associates, Ltd.: $8,505
 Cassidy & Associates, Inc: $720,000
 DNX Partners, LLC: $225,000
 Dutton & Dutton, PC: $3,694,350
 Fleishman-Hillard: $6,400,000
 Gallagher Group, LLC: $612,337.37
 Iler Interests, LP: $388,231.14
 Loeffler Tuggey Pauerstein Rosenthal, LLP: $2,350,457.12
 Loeffler, Jonas & Tuggey, LLP: $1,260,000
 MPD Consultants, LLP: $1,447,267.13
 Powell Tate, Inc: $900,732.77

Since 2015, Saudi Arabia paid $18 million to 145 registered lobbyists to influence the U.S. government.

A partial list of lobbyists that have been paid by Saudi Arabia to lobby for the Kingdom: the Podesta Group, founded by John Podesta and Tony Podesta, the Glover Park Group, former Senator Norm Coleman, H.P. Goldfield, vice chair of Madeleine Albright's Albright Stonebridge Group, the BGR Group, the Brownstein Hyatt Farber Schreck, the Squire Patton Boggs, the DLA Piper, the Pillsbury Winthrop Shaw Pittman, and the Qorvis/MSLGroup.

See also
 Saudi Arabia–United States relations
 Arab lobby in the United States

References

External links
The Sauidi Lobby: How the Kingdom Wins in Washington, Center for International Policy 

Saudi Arabia–United States relations
Lobbying in the United States